is a player character in the Dead or Alive series of fighting games by Team Ninja and Tecmo (Koei Tecmo). She was introduced in Dead or Alive 3 in 2001, replacing Ein/Hayate as the regular karate martial artist in the character roster. Hitomi is of German and Japanese descent, and she regularly enters the Dead or Alive fighting tournaments either to test her skills against other martial artists, or out of personal reasons. The character has been well received by game critics for her sex appeal and personality.

Design and gameplay

Hitomi, envisioned as a "traditionally-trained karate girl," started out initially as the intended new main heroine to replace Kasumi back when DOA3 was to feature a brand new cast of characters. She is a slender but physically fit young woman of average height. Despite her Japanese heritage, she has blue eyes and brown hair styled with straight bangs and a front fringe, and normally pushed back with a pink headband (with an ponytail in Dead or Alive 5 Ultimate). In Dead or Alive Xtreme Beach Volleyball, she stands at 161 cm in height with an 89 cm bust, with these numbers increasing or decreasing only fractionally in Dead or Alive 4 and Dead or Alive Xtreme 2. Hitomi's standard wardrobe is contemporary Western with blue jeans, tank tops, and denim jackets, all with fighting gloves. The back label of her pants regularly bears the initials of the games in which she appears, while a distinctive emblem is emblazoned on either the front of her shirt or the back of her jacket. While remodeling the characters for more realistic appearances in Dead or Alive 5, the designers made sure to keep Hitomi's headband as her distinctive trait. Her wardrobe in Dead or Alive 5 Last Round includes downloadable costumes of Alma from Koei Tecmo's Deception IV: The Nightmare Princess, Tita Russell from Nihon Falcom's The Legend of Heroes: Trails of Cold Steel, Tsubame Miyama from Square Enix's School Girl Strikers, Tanpei from Tatsunoko's Time Bokan, Juvia from Fairy Tail, and Yuri Sakazaki from SNK Playmore's The King of Fighters, among others, such as a ninja outfit and an Attack on Titan uniform.

She was planned as straightforward, easy-to-use character, as the series' creator Tomonobu Itagaki added her to Dead or Alive 3 "because of her accessibility to players of all skills." Siliconera's preview of Dead or Alive: Dimensions stated: "If you’re a DOA newcomer, start with Hitomi. She’s a nice combination of stylish moves [and is] easy to learn." Dean James of Attack of the Fanboy wrote that "Hitomi has the best punch techniques" in Dead or Alive 5 Last Round, while her recovery time "more than makes up" for her weak offense, "making her quite useful for anybody playing the series for the first time." The character compensates for her lack of power in the games with speed and technique. Matthew Rorie of GameSpot opined in their Dead or Alive 4 guide that Hitomi was a "fairly standard character" that is "not exceptionally damaging, but her speed works to her favor" as she is able to "strike between a slower character's blows or throw them off-balance with a mixture of high and low strikes." David McCutcheon of GameSpy additionally praised her quickness while adding that a "dinky powerhouse in herself, Hitomi can really wallop an opponent when needed", but "she does take a little getting used to, which is bound to throw a lot of impatient players off."

Appearances

In Dead or Alive games

Hitomi was born in Germany to a German father and Japanese mother. She was trained in karate by her father, a martial artist and dojo owner. She is energetic and cheerful, with a longtime commitment to her martial arts studies. Despite her Japanese name, Hitomi identifies more as Western, as her role in the series focuses more on her upbringing with her father while her relationship with her mother is unexplored. Due to this, her name is typically written in Katakana instead of Kanji.

After the events of the original Dead or Alive, Hitomi encounters an amnesiac named "Ein", who had been abandoned by the executive committee of the first tournament. She takes him into her home, and together they practice karate until he departs to enter the second tournament to find out about his past. He gradually regains his memories of being ninja clan leader Hayate, which enables him to return home to his village.

In Dead or Alive 3 (2001), the eighteen-year-old Hitomi (making her playable debut in the series) enters the third DOA tournament simply to prove her skills and independence. While working as a waitress for the Dead or Alive Tournament Executive Committee (DOATEC), she reunites with Ein and meets ninjutsu specialist Ayane, and during this time, Ein reveals the truth about himself to Hitomi. She additionally meets fellow contestant Jann Lee, sharing a keen passion for martial arts, the two shared martial arts philosophies and demonstrated their own martial arts skills, she later chastises him for being too hard on opponents after he brutally defeats Leifang. After Hitomi finishes third, she is allowed to quit the dojo and she transitions into life as an independent adult.

Hitomi is a secret playable character in the 2004 release Dead or Alive Ultimate, but does not appear in the game's story mode. In Dead or Alive 4 (2005), she enters the DOA tournament once more, this time in hopes of winning the cash prize after her father is stricken with an illness that puts a financial strain on the dojo despite his eventual recovery. She defeats Leifang and again faces Jann Lee after he "rescues" her from a T-rex. In the DOATEC Tritower, Hitomi encounters Hayate and pleads for him to return to her father's dojo, admitting that she does not know what to do without his guidance, but Hayate refuses, because he is no longer "Ein", while the fourth tournament is not a competition but a war. In Dead or Alive 5 (2012), Hitomi reunites with Leifang and they train together before going their separate ways. Hitomi defeats Mila in the quarterfinals and Eliot in the semifinals. Before the finals, Hitomi encounters Hayate once again, declaring that she needs to win one more fight and she will be champion. However, she is defeated by Jann Lee in the finals, making her the tournament runner-up.

In Dead or Alive Xtreme Beach Volleyball, Hitomi is invited to Zack Island for the fourth DOA tournament, which turns out to be a ruse concocted by Zack (the island's owner) in order to lure the girls of DOA into a two-week tropical vacation. In the sequel Dead or Alive Xtreme 2, Hitomi returns to the island to participate in the fifth tournament after being deceived again into a false invitation from Zack. In Dead or Alive Xtreme 3, Hitomi returns to New Zack Island after the fifth tournament to get distracted itself and have some fun before returning to her training for the next tournament.

Other appearances
Hitomi has a cameo in the 2006 live-action film DOA: Dead or Alive, played by Hung Lin. In the movie, a character resembling Hitomi is seen wearing her in-game outfit of a pink headband and a denim jacket, but she had no dialogue while her personality was given to Dead or Alive 4 protagonist Helena Douglas. Hitomi also appeared in the Ninja Gaiden series' smartphone action card game Hyakuman-nin no Ninja Gaiden (in a ninja version with a sword) in 2013 and her card was included in Sega's Samurai & Dragons game that same year.

Merchandise and promotion

Like the games' other female characters, Hitomi has been featured on an extensive range of merchandise, such as the Dead or Alive 3 Arcade Stick by Hori, multiple figurines, statuettes and action figures of various types and scales, with many of these items capitalizing on her sex appeal. She appeared in the Bijin Tokei iPhone digital clock app and a Dead or Alive voice clock. Banpresto produced a mug in 2007 emblazoned with her likeness and accented with three-dimensional breasts. Other items included body towels, dakimakura body pillowcases, "swimsuit" wall posters, and mousepads with three-dimensional renditions of the character's breasts serving as wrist rests. In 2007, Koei Tecmo featured Hitomi and Kasumi on limited-edition credit cards available exclusively in Japan to celebrate the tenth anniversary of the franchise. An officially licensed hoodie with Hitomi's Dead or Alive 5 design was made available in 2012.

Hitomi was the lone playable character in the beta version of Dead or Alive Online and one of four playable characters in a demo of Dead or Alive 5 released with Ninja Gaiden 3 in 2012. GameStop included an exclusive "bunny bikini" costume for Hitomi with pre-orders of the game. An update to Dead or Alive 5 Ultimate: Core Fighters made Hitomi a free playable character between December 2013 and January 2014; she is otherwise available for purchase through a microtransaction. Hitomi is one of the four initial playable characters in the Core Fighters version of Dead or Alive 6.

Reception
Hitomi has been a fan-favorite character since her introduction in 2001. She was voted the Dead or Alive series' fifth-most popular character in an online fan poll held by Koei Tecmo in 2014, and placed seventh in the same poll in 2015. Bryan Johnson of GameSpy collectively placed the series' female characters second in his 2003 ranking of the "top ten babes in games," illustrated with a render of Hitomi in a bikini. "Sex sells, and Tecmo was ready and willing to ... sell the idea of sexy virtual babes to the masses." The staff of Team Xbox ranked the "knockout Hitomi" as their fourth-top "Xbox babe" in 2004, placing her above DOA icon Kasumi. Wesley Yin-Poole of Videogamer.com included her among the top ten "video game crushes" in 2010. "She doesn't mind wearing bikinis. ... She's got an innocent schoolgirl vibe going on. That is all." IGN.com profiled Hitomi as part of a "Girls of DOA" weekly series in 2004, listing their favorite attributes of the character such as her headband and casual wardrobe: "Denim jeans and jacket show she's a working girl, not a debutante like some of the other women of DOAU." They additionally lauded her "underdog" status in the games while comparing her to Hilary Swank in the 1994 film The Next Karate Kid. "Sure, it's corny, but for some reason, it's also endearing." The site further commented in 2010, "Hitomi approaches each new day with characteristic optimism. Some of the other DOA babes could learn a thing or two from her."

GameSpot described Hitomi as "not particularly unique, except for the fact that she constantly reminds us of Buffy the Vampire Slayer." GamesRadar, in 2012, rated Dead or Alive 3 among their Xbox "games that shaped a generation" for its "buxom beauties meet[ing] to fight in cosplay heaven", while stating their preference for "new girl Hitomi". Cheat Code Central featured her sixth with Ayane on their 2011 list of the top ten sexiest female video game characters, while Official Xbox Magazine chose Hitomi and Leifang as a couple "most likely to have a 'college experience'."  Gavin Mackenzie of Play quipped that Hitomi's breasts were two of the top ten best things one could expect to see in Dead or Alive 5. "They’re still popular with those who value a little, but really only a little, more modesty." Hitomi joined Leifang, Kasumi, and Ayane in a four-way tie for tenth on the Spanish edition of IGN's 2011 selection of "video game hotties", and Polish tabloid Fakt showcased her among the "sexy ladies" of video games in 2009.

See also
List of Dead or Alive characters

Notes

References

External links
  (Dead or Alive 5)

Dead or Alive (franchise) characters
Female characters in video games
Fictional German people in video games
Fictional Japanese diaspora
Fictional Eurasian people
Fictional martial artists in video games
Fictional karateka
Fictional volleyball players
Koei Tecmo protagonists
Ninja characters in video games
Teenage characters in video games
Video game characters introduced in 2001
Woman soldier and warrior characters in video games